Gurla Thammirajupeta is a village panchayat in Mentada mandal of Vizianagaram district, Andhra Pradesh, India.

References

Villages in Vizianagaram district